The West Valley is a region within the Phoenix metropolitan area, in central Arizona.

It is located west of the Phoenix city limits, within Maricopa County, Arizona.

Communities

Cities and towns
 Avondale
 Buckeye
 El Mirage
 Glendale
 Goodyear
 Litchfield Park
 Peoria
 Surprise
 Tolleson
 Youngtown

Unincorporated communities
 Sun City
 Sun City West
 Waddell

Also generally considered part of the West Valley is the Phoenix neighborhood of Maryvale, which is bordered by Glendale to the north.

.
Geography of Maricopa County, Arizona
Populated places in Maricopa County, Arizona